Osaka International School of Kwansei Gakuin (OIS, 関西学院大学インターナショナルスクール) is a coeducational international school, located in Minoh, Osaka Prefecture, Japan. OIS educates students from kindergarten (age 4-5) through to grade 12. OIS is accredited by the Western Association of Schools and Colleges and is authorized to offer three International Baccalaureate (IB) programs - Primary Years Programme (PYP), Middle Years Programme (MYP), and Diploma Programme (DP).

The government of Osaka Prefecture classifies the school as a "miscellaneous school".

Photo of OIS Entrance

Photo of OIS Library

OIS shares its campus, facilities, and a number of programs with its sister school, Senri International School (SIS), a grade 7-12 Japanese-curriculum school primarily for students who have lived abroad. Together, the schools are known as the "Senri and Osaka International Schools of Kwansei Gakuin." Secondary school students from both schools share classes in physical education, music, and art. Senior students in English and Japanese can take courses in either one of the schools. Students from both schools also join for athletic teams, drama casts, choir, bands, and orchestra groups. 

Founded in 1991, OIS is a member of the Japan Council of International Schools (JCIS), the Council of International Schools (CIS) and the East Asia Regional Council of Schools (EARCOS).

Student body
As of 2016, about 33% of the school's population of Senri and Osaka international school body is made up of returnees. It is the third-largest English/European language international school in Japan and the largest school of such a field of study in the Kansai region.

References

External links

Senri and Osaka International Schools of Kwansei Gakuin

International Baccalaureate schools in Japan
Schools in Japan
Educational institutions established in 1991
Education in Osaka
International schools in Japan
1991 establishments in Japan